End of Winter is a 2014 South Korean drama film. Directed by Kim Dae-hwan in his feature debut and a project of the Graduate School of Cinematic Content at Dankook University, it explores the breakup of a family. It made its world premiere at the 19th Busan International Film Festival in 2014 and won New Currents Award.

Synopsis
Kim Sung-geun's (Mun Chang-gil) wife, two sons and daughter-in-law gather in Cheorwon for his retirement ceremony as he ends his teaching career at the Cheorwon Technical High School. While eating at a Chinese restaurant, he drops the bombshell and announces he plans to get a divorce. Without explaining his decision, it leaves his shocked wife Yoon Yeo-jung (Lee Young-ran) angry and speechless, and the family in confusion. When heavy snow prevents them from leaving, they are forced to stay at Sung-geun's apartment, leading to an uncomfortable time together as they seek shelter from the cold winter.

Cast
 Mun Chang-gil as Kim Sung-geun
 Lee Young-ran as Yoon Yeo-jung
 Kim Min-hyeuk as Kim Dong-wook 
 Lee Sang-hee as Hye-jung 
 Hur Jae-won as Su-hyung 
 Park Chan-yun

Reception
BIFF's jury head Iranian director Asghar Farhadi: "It impressed us with its stylistic consistency, its skillful exploration of family relations, its elegant mastery of cinematic space, and its great ensemble cast."

The Hollywood Reporter: "First time filmmaker Kim Dae-hwan makes an impression with a well acted and recognizable snapshot of family strife."

Screen International: "Kim Dae-hwan's impressive and dispassionate debut feature tackles such (trials and tribulations of family life) issues with a sensible sense of restraint through its rich but subtle aesthetic as it follows a family on the verge of turmoil after the father suddenly announces he wants a divorce."

Pierce Conran: "End of Winter boasts strong performances and an admirably restrained yet intelligent mis-en-scene. However, in its resemblance to many other Korean family dramas...it will have trouble standing out from the pack."

Awards and nominations

References

External links
 
 
 

2014 films
South Korean drama films
2010s Korean-language films
2010s South Korean films